The North York Civic Centre is a municipal government building in Toronto, Ontario, Canada. It opened in 1979 as the city hall of the former city of North York. It is located in North York City Centre.

Designed by Adamson Associates Architects, the building is located on Yonge Street north of Sheppard Avenue, and features Mel Lastman Square along the Yonge Street frontage. The construction of the building was intended to act as a catalyst for the development of the "North York City Centre", a downtown area for the formerly suburban North York. The building received The Governor General's Medal for Architecture in 1982.

With municipal amalgamation, North York is now part of the City of Toronto, and the building no longer serves as a city hall. Today, the building is home to the North York Community Council and a number of local municipal departments and services. Opposite the Civic Centre is the North York Central Library branch of the Toronto Public Library.

The Civic Centre is served by the Toronto Transit Commission's North York Centre subway station (opened in 1987).

Previous Municipal Offices
 Temporary home for council meetings at Brown (Willowdale) School and Golden Lion Hotel 1922
 1st North York Township Office 5145 Yonge Street (at Empress Avenue) 1923–1956; 2 storey American colonial building was built by Murray Brown with additions added in the 1940s; re-purposed as courthouse and other civic uses, partially demolished in 1989 (partial facade rebuilt in Empress Walk
 North York Township/Borough Office 5000 Yonge Street Burnett Avenue 1956–1975; 3 storey building was built by Sproatt & Rolph and awarded the Massey Medal for Architecture in 1958; site sold in 1975 and later as site of North York Performing Arts Centre

See also
 East York Civic Centre
 Etobicoke Civic Centre
 Scarborough Civic Centre
 York Civic Centre
 Metro Hall
 Toronto City Hall

References

Buildings and structures completed in 1979
Municipal buildings in Toronto
City and town halls in Ontario
Former seats of local government
North York
1979 establishments in Ontario